Reality Check is the debut studio album by French synth-pop band the Teenagers. It was released on 18 March 2008 by Merok Records and XL Recordings.

Track listing

Charts

References

2008 debut albums
The Teenagers (French band) albums
XL Recordings albums